The Vatra literary magazine was founded in 1885 by Ion Luca Caragiale, George Coşbuc and Ioan Slavici and was published in Romanian in the city of Târgu Mureş, Transylvania, Austria-Hungary (now in Romania).

A new series of the magazine was published starting May 1971 under the direction of poet and playwright Romulus Guga.

Vatra means "the hearth" in Romanian.

References

External links
 Revista Vatra

Defunct literary magazines published in Europe
Defunct magazines published in Romania
Magazines established in 1885
Magazines with year of disestablishment missing
Mass media in Târgu Mureș
Romanian-language magazines
Literary magazines published in Romania